Ronny Weller (born 22 July 1969 in Oelsnitz, Saxony) is a German weightlifter who competed for East Germany and later for Germany.

During the 1990s, he was three times world champion, and broke world records 11 times. He participated in the Olympic Games five times, winning four medals. At the 2004 Summer Olympics in Athens he had to retire from the contest due to an injury he suffered during the snatch competition.

He is, jointly with fellow (East) German Ingo Steinhöfel, the second weightlifter to compete at five Olympics. The first was Hungarian Imre Földi from 1960-76.

Major results

Personal records
 Snatch: 205 kg in 1989 on Fort Lauderdale in class to 110 kg (junior world record until 1992).
 Snatch: 210 kg (former world record in weight class over 105 kg)
 Clean and jerk: 260.0 kg 1998 in Riesa in class over 105 kg (European record 1998–2018)
 Total: 467.5 kg (210+257.5) 2000 Summer Olympics in class over 105 kg (that was a world record in old weight class over 105 kg)

See also
List of athletes with the most appearances at Olympic Games

References

External links

 Ronny Weller at Lift Up
 Ronny Weller at Weightlifting Exchange
 Ronny Weller at Database Weightlifting
 Sports-Reference Profile

1969 births
Living people
People from Oelsnitz, Vogtland
German male weightlifters
Olympic weightlifters of East Germany
Olympic weightlifters of Germany
Olympic gold medalists for Germany
Olympic silver medalists for Germany
Olympic bronze medalists for East Germany
Weightlifters at the 1988 Summer Olympics
Weightlifters at the 1992 Summer Olympics
Weightlifters at the 1996 Summer Olympics
Weightlifters at the 2000 Summer Olympics
Weightlifters at the 2004 Summer Olympics
Olympic medalists in weightlifting
Medalists at the 2000 Summer Olympics
Medalists at the 1996 Summer Olympics
Medalists at the 1992 Summer Olympics
Medalists at the 1988 Summer Olympics
European Weightlifting Championships medalists
World Weightlifting Championships medalists
Sportspeople from Saxony